Bisaat is a 2021-2022 Pakistani television series directed by Fahim Burney and produced by Fahim Burney in collaboration with  Momina Duraid under banner MD Productions. It stars Azfar Rehman, Ayesha Omar, Mirza Zain Baig and Anmol Baloch in leading roles. The series premiered on 28 November 2021 on Hum TV in night prime-time slot.

Cast
Azfar Rehman as Jahanzeb
Anmol Baloch as Afreen
Ayesha Omar as Sophie 
Mirza Zain Baig as Murtaza
Saba Hameed as Noor Ammi
Shagufta Ejaz as Arooj
Sajid Shah as Kareem
Syeda Tooba Anwar as Sania
Sharmeen Ali as Afshan

References

External links
Bisaat Archives at Hum TV

Hum TV original programming
2021 Pakistani television series debuts
2022 Pakistani television series endings